Pinguicula agnata is a tropical species of carnivorous plant in the family Lentibulariaceae. Its flowers are a blue-violet color.

agnata